The "March of the Artillerymen" (Russian: Марш артиллеристов romanized: Marš Artilleristov), also known as the "Artillerymen's March", is a 1943 Russian song, written by Viktor Gusev and composed by Tikhon Khrennikov.

Lyrics

Original lyrics in 1943

Lyrics in 1954
Due to De-Stalinization after the death of Stalin in 1953, some of the lyrics have been changed to discourage the worship of Stalin.

Lyrics in 1970s
Under the rule of Brezhnev, the Communist Party was emphasized, so the lyrics changed again.

References

Compositions by Tikhon Khrennikov
1943 songs
Soviet songs
Russian military songs
Russian military marches